George Denis Pruen Cordner (28 June 1924 – 17 October 1990) was an Australian rules footballer, industrial chemist and diplomat.

Early years
Cordner was the third of four sons to Edward "Ted" Cordner and Margaret Constance née Pruen. Like his father, Cordner and his brothers Ted (1919-1996), Don (1922-2009) and John (1929-2016) were also notable sportsmen.

Football

Melbourne (VFL)
Cordner made his senior VFL football debut in Round 5 of the 1943 VFL season for  against  at Punt Road Oval while on leave from the Royal Australian Navy. It was the only time he played with his older brothers Don and Ted. Cordner was flattened five seconds into the match, but recovered and went on to kick two goals in a losing cause.

University Blacks (VAFA)

Following the war, Cordner played in the Victorian Amateur Football Association (VAFA) for the University Blacks while studying a Bachelor of Science, specializing in metallurgy. He was the fifth Cordner to represent the Blacks and provided outstanding service in his three seasons with the club, finishing second in the VAFA A Grade Best and Fairest Award count in 1946 and 1947 before winning it in 1948. That year he was also club premiership captain.

Melbourne (VFL)
At the same time, Cordner was still a registered Melbourne player, and was called up to play his second senior VFL game in the drawn 1948 VFL Grand Final, where he played a sterling high marking game at centre half-back. He played again in the Grand Final Replay and was a Melbourne premiership player in just his third game of senior football.

Cordner switched permanently to the Melbourne Football Club in 1949, and played for the club primarily in the ruck for the next eight years.

Cordner went on to play in two more premiership teams for Melbourne, in 1955 and 1956. He retired at the end of the 1956 season, and was notable for having played his entire VFL career as an amateur.

Cricket
Cordner was also a capable cricketer, known for his bowling. He played 40 district cricket matches for University between 1946/47 and 1953/54, taking 60 wickets at 23.8. In an intervarsity match at the University Oval in Sydney in 1949, he took nine wickets (six of those in the second innings) for the match to help Melbourne beat Sydney.

Life after football

Australian Consul-General in New York
In September 1981, Cordner was appointed Australian Consul-General in New York. He took up the post in March 1982. Cordner's wife Pat was mugged on her first day out in New York city. In March 1984, Cordner was asked to return to Australia within three months.

Business leader
On returning to Australia, Cordner served in a number of leadership positions. He became a chairman of John Holland Constructions, chairman of Australian Motor Industries and a director of the Australian branch of British Petroleum and Plessey Pacific.

Death
Cordner died of coronary heart disease on 17 October 1990 at his home in East Kew, and was buried in Point Lonsdale Cemetery. He was survived by his wife and two daughters.

Posthumous honours

Team of the Century (MFC)
In 2000, he was named in the Melbourne's "Team of the Century" as the starting ruckman, with Ron Barassi as his ruck-rover, and Stuart Spencer as his rover (his brother, Don Cordner, was selected as the back-pocket ruckman).

Hall of Fame (MFC)
In 2001, he was one of the 24 inaugural inductees into the Melbourne Football Club's "Hall of Fame" (his brother, Don Cordner, was also an inaugural inductee).

"150 Heroes" (MFC)
On 7 June 2008, as part of its 150th anniversary celebrations, the Melbourne Football Club announced its list of "150 Heroes", Denis Cordner and two of his brothers, Don Corner, and Ted Cordner, were named on the list.

See also
 Australian football at the 1956 Summer Olympics
 List of Consuls-General of Australia in New York

References

Bibliography

External links

 Denis Cordner, at Demonwiki.
"Some Inspirational People" Profiled by Laurence MacDonald Muir.
Profile at the Australian Dictionary of Biography

1924 births
1990 deaths
Melbourne Football Club players
Keith 'Bluey' Truscott Trophy winners
Melbourne Football Club captains
University Blacks Football Club players
Australian rules footballers from Melbourne
Australian footballers at the 1956 Summer Olympics
Consuls-General of Australia in New York
Royal Australian Navy personnel of World War II
Melbourne Football Club Premiership players
Three-time VFL/AFL Premiership players
Scientists from Melbourne
People from Diamond Creek, Victoria